The 1993–94 Eliteserien season was the 37th season of ice hockey in Denmark. Ten teams participated in the league, and Herning IK won the championship.

First round

Final round

Playoffs

External links
Season on hockeyarchives.info

Dan
Eliteserien (Denmark) seasons
1993 in Danish sport
1994 in Danish sport